The Khizarzai (commonly known as Khadarzai) is a subtribe of the Mandanr branch of the Yousafzaitribe . The tribe is named after Khizar Khan, one of the four sons of Mandanr (Mahmood Khan, Khizar Khan, Razar and Manu).  Khizar Khan is buried in Shawa area of Swabi District in Khyber-Pakhtunkhwa.  The Khizarzai(Khadarzai) are based in Swabi, SWAT and Nowshehra Districts of Khyber Pakhtunkhwa.

Yusufzai Pashtun tribes